Lisa Morzenti (born 23 January 1998) is an Italian former racing cyclist, who rode professionally between 2017 and 2019 for the ,  and  teams. She rode in the women's time trial event at the 2017 UCI Road World Championships.

References

External links
 

1998 births
Living people
Italian female cyclists
Mediterranean Games silver medalists for Italy
Competitors at the 2018 Mediterranean Games
People from Seriate
Mediterranean Games medalists in cycling
Cyclists from the Province of Bergamo